The 1892 Penn Quakers football team represented the University of Pennsylvania in the 1892 college football season. The Quakers finished with a 15–1 record in their first year under head coach and College Football Hall of Fame inductee, George Washington Woodruff. Significant games included victories over Penn State (20–0), Navy (16–0), Lafayette (8–6 and 10–4), and Princeton (6–4), and its sole loss to undefeated national champion Yale (28–0).  The 1892 Penn team outscored its opponents by a combined total of 405 to 52. Penn halfback Harry Thayer was selected by both Walter Camp and Caspar Whitney as a first-team player on the 1892 College Football All-America Team.

Schedule

References

Penn
Penn Quakers football seasons
Penn Quakers football